More Fun in the New World is the fourth studio album by American rock band X, released in September 1983 by Elektra Records. It was reissued with four bonus tracks by Rhino Records in 2002. It was the last X album produced by Ray Manzarek.

The single "The New World" appeared on the soundtrack to the 1986 movie Something Wild.

Pearl Jam's Eddie Vedder and Supersuckers covered "Devil Doll" and "Poor Girl" for the Free the West Memphis 3 project in 2000; Pearl Jam also covered "The New World" and "I Must Not Think Bad Thoughts" with Tim Robbins live during the 2004 Vote for Change tour.

Track listing
All tracks written by John Doe and Exene Cervenka except as indicated.

Side A
 "The New World" – 3:25
 "We're Having Much More Fun" – 3:05
 "True Love" – 2:15
 "Poor Girl" – 2:50
 "Make the Music Go Bang" – 3:00
 "Breathless" (Otis Blackwell) – 2:15
 "I Must Not Think Bad Thoughts" – 4:10

Side B
 "Devil Doll" – 3:05
 "Painting the Town Blue" – 3:20
 "Hot House" – 2:55
 "Drunk in My Past" – 2:51
 "I See Red" – 3:00
 "True Love Pt. #2" – 5:00

Bonus tracks (2002 reissue)
 "Poor Girl" (Demo/Remix) – 2:58
 "True Love Pt. #2" (Demo/Remix) – 4:56
 "Devil Doll" (Demo/Remix) – 3:12
 "I Must Not Think Bad Thoughts" (Demo/Remix) – 5:45

Personnel
X
Billy Zoom – guitar
D.J. Bonebrake – drums, percussion
Exene Cervenka – vocals
John X. Doe – vocals, bass

Charts

References

External links 
X performing Breathless on David Letterman

X (American band) albums
1983 albums
Elektra Records albums
Albums produced by Ray Manzarek